The 1933 Dunedin mayoral election was part of the New Zealand local elections held that same year. In 1933, elections were held for the Mayor of Dunedin plus other local government positions including twelve city councillors. The polling was conducted using the standard first-past-the-post electoral method.

Robert Black, the incumbent Mayor, sought re-election but was defeated by Edwin Cox, a clergyman who had the backing of the Labour movement.

Mayoralty results

Council results

References

Mayoral elections in Dunedin
1933 elections in New Zealand
Politics of Dunedin
1930s in Dunedin